Yi San, also known as Lee San, Wind of the Palace, is a 2007 South Korean historical drama, starring Lee Seo-jin and Han Ji-min. It aired on MBC from September 17, 2007 to June 16, 2008 on Mondays and Tuesdays at 21:55. The series was directed by Lee Byung-hoon, who also created the award-winning television series Dae Jang Geum.

Lee Seo-jin and Han Ji-min received recognition for their performances at the MBC Drama Awards.

Synopsis
The series dramatizes the life of Korea's King Jeongjo, the 22nd ruler of the Joseon Dynasty. Jeongjo is remembered in Korean history for his sympathy with the plight of the common man, in spite of his own pampered upbringing as royalty.

The drama begins with the King's early years, during which he befriends two children working in the Palace who are later expelled. King Yeongjo (Yi San's grandfather) seals San's father, Crown Prince Sado, in a rice chest with no food or water because he fears that the Crown Prince is planning a coup. San wants to save his father, and with the help of his friends Seong Song-yeon and Park Dae-su, begs King Yeongjo to forgive the Crown Prince.

The drama then skips forward to Jeongjo's adult years when he and his friends re-establish contact with each other. Throughout, his position as heir is threatened by palace intrigues.

Yi San begins to fall in love with one of his childhood friends, Seong Song-yeon, whose father, a palace artist, died when she was young. The story then follows his rise to power, his assumption of the kingship, and the labyrinthine palace intrigues that he must constantly guard against from the Noron Faction.

While the show does deviate from the historical record in a number of ways, its representation of court life during the Joseon Dynasty appears to be based on contemporary sources.

Cast

Main  
Yi San/King Jeongjo (played by Lee Seo-jin and Park Ji-bin) 
 The main protagonist in the series. He is the only son of Crown Prince Sado and Lady Hyegyeong. Extremely kind and generous, he makes frequent trips under disguise to see how the common people are doing. The series spans from San's childhood at the age of eleven, when Crown Prince Sado is being executed, to about 40 years later, when San himself reigned as King. It was during the beginning of the series when San met Seong Song-yeon and Park Dae-su. In episode 1, he disguises himself as a junior eunuch and sneaks into the courtyard where his father was imprisoned in a rice chest. With the help of Dae-su and Song-yeon, he manages to see him and obey his father's last wish. The friendship that developed as a result would last the entire series. The plot then fast-forwards ten years, when San is an adult. San is a filial child who loved his father unconditionally despite the opposition, and never denied his father's innocence, which caused him to get into trouble several times. He also never bore a grudge against King Yeongjo, his grandfather, despite Yeongjo's sometimes unfair and harsh treatment towards him. San loved his grandfather deeply. Loyal to his subjects and people, he hates it when someone risks their own life for his, and always tries to protect them instead. While he is still Crown Prince, he falls in love with Song-yeon who became his source of comfort and warmth. Later, when he becomes King, Song-yeon is finally made his concubine. Although San tries to hide it, he never liked the other concubines his mother brought in and hardly ever spent time with them, only doing so once in a while out of a sense of duty as a King, a fact which he is bitter about. San likes practicing martial arts with the Royal Guards and traveling incognito in order to feel the experience of the people. When doing so, he adopts the pseudonym Yi Mu-duk. He suffered severe pain and heartbreak when Song-yeon passes away. While he gravely misses and thinks of her every day, he continued to keep his promise to her that he will withstand everything and be a good King. He is implied to be together with Song-yeon again in their afterlife, where he is finally at peace and happy to spend the rest of eternity with the woman he loves.

Titles: Yi San, Wangseson Jeoha (His Royal Highness the Grand Heir→왕세손 저하), Jusang Jeonha (His Majesty the King→주상 전하)

Pseudonym: Yi(Ga) Mu-duk (Mu-duk of the Yi clan→이(가) 무덕)

Seong Song-yeon/Seong Ui-bin (played by Han Ji-min and Lee Han-na)
King Jeongjo's love interest. She is the daughter of a skilled palace artist and thus has a fondness for art. Orphaned at a young age with a baby brother to take care of, she was taken in by a relative who helped her become a palace maid so that she could gain a standing. She entered the palace when she was 11, and her relative sent her baby brother, Seong Song-wook, to the family of a local physician who was kind enough to adopt him. On her first night in the palace Song-yeon met San, who was trying to get to the rice chest that held his father. Sadly, she and Dae-su were caught and kicked out of the palace. Angry at her, the relative that helped her enter the palace refused to take her in, so Dae-su's uncle, senior eunuch Park Dal-ho, took her in and raised her with Dae-su. However, enemies of the prince forced them all to flee the capital. They fled promising that they would return to the palace to keep their friendship. This they do, and Song-yeon becomes a damo (female painting assistant) and enters the Bureau of Painting. The promise of returning to the palace is not fulfilled until Song-yeon paints a Qilin for an ambassador from Qing China. Curious to learn more about her, San inquires at the Bureau and realized it was Song-yeon. He quickly visits her home where he finds Dae-su and his uncle. From then on, the three stay together. Song-yeon falls in love with San because of his kind heart and loyal personality, and shows great concern for him. Although Song-yeon loves San unconditionally, she thinks it is unwise to be with San as she assumes she would be an obstacle for him due to her lowly status, no matter how much she wants to be by his side. San eventually persuaded her to be with him, telling her that he loves her not as King, but a man. However, few people accept her due to her low status (damo were considered lower than slaves) and the fact that she was orphaned. It is not until she gives birth to a boy that she is accepted and formally recognized as the King's concubine. Unfortunately, her first son dies of illness and causes her to suffer severe grief. Consequentially, when she is urged to take medicine for her liver cancer, she refuses as it would kill her second child. Song-yeon dies of liver cancer while pregnant with her second child near the end of the series, but returns to San in a dream one last time just before his death. In the series, Song-yeon is portrayed as a beautiful, kind, and intelligent young person. She manages to rise from a lowly damo to a real Bureau artist and later to becomes one of the highest ranking women in the country, second only to the Queen.

Titles: Seong(Ga) Song-yeon (Song-yeon of the Seong clan→성(가) 송연), Seong Sanggung (Court Lady Seong→성 상궁) So-yong Seong-ssi (Royal Consort So-yong of the Seong clan→소용 성씨), Ui-bin Seong-ssi (Royal Noble Consort Ui of the Seong clan→의빈 성씨)

Park Dae-su (played by Lee Jong-soo and Kwon Jung-Min)
King Jeongjo's favorite military officer. Dae-su was originally a junior eunuch in the palace. Because he wasn't castrated, he wanted to leave. When he tried to flee, he met Song-yeon and San. Like Song-yeon, he too got kicked out for helping San. Song-yeon and Dae-su know each other very well, as they practically grew up together. Both are orphans, but Dae-su's uncle raised them. When Song-yeon entered the Bureau, Dae-su took the military exam and became a palace guard of the Crown Prince. From there, Dae-su was promoted until he became the Grand Commander of the Dragon Guard, the finest army division in Joseon and the King's personal guard. Dae-su started out very dumb and dependent, but when he took the military exam, his tutors helped him become a decent man; intelligent, independent, and calm. Without this change, he might have become a simple street thug. Dae-su is extremely supportive and defensive of San and would beat up anyone who dares to insult him. He is one of the three military guards who always loyally follow the King. The other two military guards are Kang Suk-ki, a perceptive archer, and Suh Jang-bo, a stubborn fighter. Song-yeon is Dae-su's love interest, but he gave up trying to court her after he realized that she is in love with San. He was alive during the reign of Yi San's son, King Sunjo and was implied to have joined them in the afterlife soon afterwards where they played together again as children. It is possible that he is based on Baek Dong-soo, a bodyguard who was famous for saving King Jeongjo on multiple occasions.
Lady Hyegyeong (played by Kyeon Mi-ri)
Jeongjo's mother. She is the daughter of high-ranking court official Hong Bong-han of the Pungsan Hong clan. Ever worrisome over the royal family and the people, she is a model mother of the Joseon upper class. She never approved of the relationship between Song-yeon and San due to Song-yeon's low status and tried numerous ways to separate them. Lady Hyegyeong was also the main cause of Song-yeon's suffering when she became a concubine. Eventually, through Song-yeon's efforts, Lady Hyegyeong saw her good personality and started to finally accept her. When she learns that Song-yeon is pregnant, she finally acknowledges her as a royal concubine. Lady Hyegyeong is also responsible for the multiple concubines brought in to bear an heir.
Queen Hyoui (played by Park Eun-hye) 
King Jeongjo's primary wife, born into the Cheongpung Kim clan. She was betrothed to San at the age of 10 and married him in her late teens (around 19). Hyoui is very kind, filial, refined, and honest, a model wife of the Joseon upper class. She has the respect of almost everyone in the palace and she does not abuse this power. Unfortunately, the Queen is unable to bear children and thus results in Jeongjo's mother bringing in multiple concubines. Queen Hyoui favors Song-yeon, and it is with her help that Song-yeon becomes a concubine and gives birth to a son. Queen Hyoui dies soon after King Jeongjo's death.
King Yeongjo (played by Lee Soon-jae)
Jeongjo's grandfather. He was the 21st King of Joseon before San took over. At the beginning of the series, Yeongjo has two surviving children from a concubine, his second son Crown Prince Sado, and a daughter, Princess Hwawan. King Yeongjo is a loving and experienced old man, but he is very firm on San so he can make him the next ruler. Yeongjo always suspected his second son of high treason, and throughout the series, that was shown. It was not till just before his death that he discovered that it had all been a plot. Yeongjo publicly made it known that it had been a false accusation and had his son's grave repaired. Like San, Yeongjo loved the people and when he knew he would die, he sneaked out of the palace and went to his private residence so that he could die among the people. Before dying, he commissioned Song-yeon to create a portrait of Crown Prince Sado to replace the ones that had been destroyed. Before dying, he looks at the painting while apologizing to his son for being a terrible father and promising him to be a better father to him in the afterlife. Yeongjo died of dementia, in 1776, while in his 80s.
Queen Jeongsun (played by Kim Yeo-jin)
King Yeongjo's second wife. She is the daughter of the extremely wealthy and powerful Gyeongju Kim clan. Yeongjo married her when he was 66 and she was 15. Of all the characters in the series, Queen Jeongsun has the best split character. She is very caring and smart, but deep inside she has a greed for power, is very manipulative and holds a silent grudge against San even though she is his step-grandmother. Queen Jeongsun is the leader of the conservative Noron Faction and the mastermind behind a decades long plot to destroy San. Later, she is forced to give up her titles and power but is permitted to live in the palace.
Princess Hwawan (played by Sung Hyun-ah)
Yeongjo's beloved daughter. Hwawan is a very beautiful and filial, but impatient young woman. Because she is widowed and has no children, she adopted the orphan Jeong Hu-gyeom, who became a court official. Like Queen Jeongsun, Princess Hwawan affiliated with the Noron Faction and is also a mastermind in the plot to destroy Yi San. This costs her the favor of her father. In the end, Princess Hwawan is stripped of her titles and exiled to a place far from the capital, where she lives in seclusion under house arrest with only her lady-in-waiting to accompany her.
Jeong Hu-gyeom (played by Cho Yeon-woo) 
Princess Hwawan's adoptive son. He is incredibly intelligent, and the youngest person to be part of the government, serving as Royal Secretary. He is very smart and filial to his adoptive mother. When he was a child, he was San's study partner at the Confucian Academy. In his teens he studied in Qing China and as an adult he is very successful. Like his adoptive mother, he is a key member of the Noron Faction and also part of the plot to destroy San. When the participants are punished, Hu-gyeom is exiled and put to death by poison, but not before warning Hong Guk-yeong from personal experience that he too would fall from grace if he couldn't keep his lust for power in check.
Hong Guk-yeong (played by Han Sang-jin)
King Jeongjo's right-hand man, as well as distant cousin to his mother, Lady Hyegyeong (both are members of the Pungsan Hong clan). He is a very loyal adviser to Yi San, but very ambitious and can be somewhat shady. Hong is at times hungry for power and when he has it, he sometimes abuses it. He was also the main tutor who helped Dae-su when he was training for the military exam. Throughout the series, he was promoted to Chief Inspector, Chief of the Royal Guard, and Chief Secretary due to his skill at politics and investigation. His younger sister also became one of Jeongjo's concubines and Hong Guk-yeong hoped to have enhance his influence by being related to the King's future heir. However, his sister would die out of grief after a failed cover-up of a phantom pregnancy (due to potential scandal). Enraged over the fact that she died unforgiven by Queen Hyoui and her remark that he would have no influence over the next heir, he made a bargain with Queen Jeongsun to allow him to be the adoptive parent of a member of the royal family. In the end, he was exiled for trying to poison Queen Hyoui out of anger over his sister's death and to prevent his bargain from being exposed, for Queen Hyoui discovered it and threatened to tell King Jeongjo. He aborted the attempt after discovering that the King was taking her place at the food ceremony and tearfully confessed. He later died at peace due to health issues after being forgiven by the King.
Jeong Yak-yong (played by Song Chang-eui) 
A scholar from the Confucian Academy and a member of the Namin Faction, he was initially unable to enter the court for three years. Later, after entering, he replaced Hong Guk-yeong as Yi San's closest adviser. While not as politically skilled as his predecessor, he is extremely innovative and is a talented inventor. As a skilled-albeit clumsy investigator, he is also aware of the flaws in the government and called for reforms.
Yang Cho-bi (played by Lee Ip-sae) 
A damo at the Bureau of Painting. At first she was very rude to Song-yeon. But when she fell in love with Dae-su and discovered that Song-yeon was practically his sister, she became nicer to her. At first it was for Dae-su, but eventually she developed a real bond and friendship with Song-yeon. When Song-yeon became concubine to Jeongjo, Cho-bi was selected to be her lady-in-waiting, an attendant court lady of the 6th rank (in Joseon, all royalty, palace servants and government officials are ranked on a system of 1–9, with 1 being the highest rank and 9 being the lowest rank). After Song-yeon's death, Cho-bi becomes Queen Hyoui's second lady-in-waiting.
Kim Gwi-joo (played by Park Young-ji)
Queen Jeongsun's older brother and a member of the Noron Faction. He is a high-ranking minister of the royal court. Very aggressive, he can easily beat up anyone who makes him or his sister look bad. He has a very lively and straight forward personality and is highly loved by his sister. He is also very intelligent and loves travelling to the city of Pyongyang. He plotted to kill San alongside Princess Hwawan. After his participation in the plots is discovered, Lord Kim is stripped of his titles and exiled.
Nam Si-cho (played by Maeng Sang-hoon) 
San's chief eunuch. He follows San everywhere he goes and is very supportive of him.
Chae Je-gong (played by Han In-soo) 
San's administrative assistant. Chae is also Minister of the Tribunal (in charge of national prisons). When San was a child, Sir Chae was also his tutor. Chae is always of help to San and very supportive of his commands. He is also a trusted adult source of advice to Dae Su, Song-yeon, Hong Guk-yeong, and San.
Yi Cheon/Lee Chun (played by Ji Sang-ryeol) 
A Royal Artist at the Bureau of Painting. He is by far the most supportive person of Song Yeon at the Bureau. He is great at painting erotica and drawing sketches but is otherwise a not-so-extraordinary artist. Yi Cheon is very funny and bubbly and is always trying to keep his wife happy so she doesn't kill him.
Artist Tak Ji Soo (played by Yoo Min Hyuk) 
Another Royal Artist at the Bureau of Painting. He is by far much more skilled than Yi Chun and becomes good friends with Song Yeon (whom he secretly has a crush on).  In the last episode, Tak is promoted to a Senior Artist of the 5th rank.
Yi Hyang (Yi Sun), Crown Prince Munhyo (played by Cha Jae-dol)  
The infant son of King Jeongjo and Seong Song-yeon/Ui-bin Seong who died at the age of four.

Supporting

Others (fictional characters) 

 Yoo Jung-Suk as Seong Song-Wook, Song-Yeon's littlebrother
 Jung Ho-Geun as Min Joo-Shik
 Son Il-Kwon as Oh Jung-Ho
 Gyeong In-Seon as Mak-Seon
 Lee Jung-Young as Shin-Geom
 Baek-Min as Eo-Ui
 Hwang Il-Chung
 Maeng Bong-Hak
 Jo Jae-Yoon as Kkak Jung-Yi
 Lee Jung-Sung

Special appearance 

 Lee Chang-hoon as Crown Prince Sado, Lee San's father and Yeongjo's son
 He was skilled at archery, calligraphy, and painting. He was courted by the So-ron Faction (who fell from power) and was later framed by the No-ron Faction. After being accused of treason against the throne by his own father, King Yeongjo, Sado was sentenced to death in a rice chest. San, in secret, came to see him a few nights before he died. Sado told San to retrieve a painting he had painted of a scene King Yeongjo cherished. Sadly, Sado died before Yeongjo saw the painting. Later on, it was an adult Song-Yeon who discovered the meaning of the painting and brought it to Yeongjo, 14 years after Sado's death. With the secret revealed to the king, Yeongjo understood and Sado's name was cleared.
 Hwang Geum-hee as Royal Noble Consort Wonbin Hong
 Choi Jung Woo as Crown Prince Sado's eunuch (fiction character)
 Yoo Jae-suk
 Park Myung-soo
 Jeong Jun-ha
 Jung Hyung-don
 Noh Hong-chul
 Im Hyun-Sik

Episode Ratings
Yi San was popular and recorded a solid viewership rate (average) of 26.4% (Nationwide) and 28.6% (Seoul) and a peak of 35.3% (Nationwide) and 38.6% (Seoul)

Awards and nominations

International Broadcast
In Sri Lanka, the drama aired on Rupavahini dubbed in Sinhala from 7 July 2014 to 9 February 2015. Under the title, යහපත් මහරජ - Yahapath Maharaja

Notes

References

External links
 Yi San official MBC website 
 
 

Korean-language television shows
MBC TV television dramas
Television series set in the Joseon dynasty
2007 South Korean television series debuts
2008 South Korean television series endings
South Korean historical television series
Television series by Kim Jong-hak Production